Konstantinos Alexandropoulos (Greek: Κωνσταντίνος Αλεξανδρόπουλος, born February 26, 1957, in Thessaloniki) is a former Greek sailor.

He is also a sailboat trainer and the founder of the Hellenic Police Sailing Team.

With his team, he has achieved several successes including the two-time world champion, one in 1999 in the Netherlands as team leader and one in 2002 in Spain as the coach.

Honours 
 World Sailing Championships
 Oro - 1999, 2002

 Argento -  1997
 European Sailing Championships
 Oro - 1991, 1994, 1996

 Argento - 1992

 Bronzo - 1995

References

External links 
 ΙΣΤΙΟΠΛΟΪΚΗ ΟΜΑΔΑ ΕΛΛΗΝΙΚΗΣ ΑΣΤΥΝΟΜΙΑΣ, j24class.gr.
 

1957 births
Living people
Greek sailors